Cipangopaludina lecythoides is a species of a freshwater snail with an operculum and a gill, an aquatic gastropod mollusk in the family Viviparidae, the river snails.

Distribution
Distribution of Cipangopaludina lecythoides includes Zhejiang Province in China Hong Kong and Vietnam.

References

External links

Viviparidae
Taxobox binomials not recognized by IUCN